Penstemon deustus is a species of penstemon known by the common names hotrock penstemon and scabland penstemon. It is native to much of the northwestern United States from the Pacific Northwest to Wyoming, where it grows in many types of forest and open plateau habitat, often on soils heavy in volcanic rock or on limestone outcrops. It is a perennial herb with upright branches approaching  in maximum height. The thick leaves are lance-shaped to oval or round, and are sharply toothed. Most leaves occur low on the plant. The inflorescence produces tubular flowers with lipped, five-lobed mouths. The glandular flower is cream in color with dark lining and reaches 1.5 cm in length.

This plant is used in wilderness revegetation and landscaping projects in its native region. It is favored for its low water needs and its abundant flowers which attract pollinators, including honey bees, bumblebees, sweat bees, and leafcutter bees.

References

External links
Jepson Manual Treatment
Photo gallery

deustus
Flora of the United States